The Penderwicks on Gardam Street is a children's novel by Jeanne Birdsall, published by Random House Children's Books in 2008. It is the second book in the Penderwicks series, and is preceded by The Penderwicks. Both The Penderwicks on Gardam Street and The Penderwicks were New York Times Best Sellers. The books in the series also include The Penderwicks at Point Mouette, The Penderwicks in Spring, and The Penderwicks at Last, the last of them being published in 2018.

References 

2008 American novels
American children's novels
Novels set in Massachusetts
Books by Jeanne Birdsall
2008 children's books